Jhonny Alexander Rentería Jiménez (born 26 March 1997) is a Colombian sprinter. He has won several medals at regional level.

His personal bests are 10.18 seconds in the 100 metres (-1.1 m/s, Cochabamba 2018) and 20.95 seconds in the 200 metres (+0.5 m/s, Medellín 2017).

International competitions

References

1997 births
Living people
Colombian male sprinters
Athletes (track and field) at the 2018 South American Games
South American Games gold medalists for Colombia
South American Games medalists in athletics
Athletes (track and field) at the 2019 Pan American Games
Pan American Games competitors for Colombia
South American Games gold medalists in athletics
Competitors at the 2018 Central American and Caribbean Games
21st-century Colombian people